Axinidris hylekoites is a species of ant in the genus Axinidris. Described by Shattuck in 1991, the species is endemic to Nigeria, where it was found alongside a road within some vegetation.

References

Endemic fauna of Nigeria
Axinidris
Hymenoptera of Africa
Insects described in 1991